Mohd Syamsuri Mustafa (born 6 February 1981) is a Malaysian footballer currently playing as a goalkeeper for Hanelang F.C. in the Malaysia FAM League.

Club career
Before moved to Pahang FA, he was the primary goalkeeper for Terengganu FA. His biggest achievement with Terengganu was being a runner up in the 2004 Malaysia FA Cup. Terengganu lost 3-0 after conceding three goals in extra time against Perak FA. For 2009 season, Syamsuri returned to Terengganu but this time with PBDKT T-Team FC.

International career
He was part of the Malaysia national team and Malaysia League XI that faced Brazil and Manchester United in 2002. He also represented Malaysia in the 2001 and 2003 SEA Games, the 2002 Tiger Cup, the 2004 Tiger Cup, and the 2007 ASEAN Football Championship. At the 2003 SEA Games in Vietnam, Syamsuri became the first Malaysian goalkeeper to score a goal in an international match. He scored a long range goal from a drop kick from his own penalty area in Malaysia's 3-4 defeat against hosts Vietnam.

In 2007, Syamsuri did not take part in Malaysia's disastrous 2007 AFC Asian Cup performance on disciplinary grounds. He has not been called up for the national squad since his last appearance against Sri Lanka on 26 March 2007.

In his return with the national team, he played 68 minutes and conceded three goals against the UAE.

Honours

Club
Terengganu
 Malaysia FA Cup runner-up: 2004

T-Team
 Malaysia Premier League promotion: 2009

International
Malaysia U-23
 Silver Medalist 2001 SEA Games

Malaysia
 Third Place 2004 AFF Championship

Individual
 FAM Football Awards – Best Goalkeeper Award: 2005-06 – Terengganu
 FAM Football Awards – Most Popular Award: 2005-06 –Terengganu

Records
The first Asian goalkeeper to score the longest goal: 2003
The18.com the longest goals of all time(est. 95-100 yards): 6th place 2021

See also 
 List of goalscoring goalkeepers

References

External links
 
 Mohd Syamsuri Mustafa Goal at 2003 Sea Games

1981 births
Malaysian footballers
Malaysian people of Malay descent
Malaysia international footballers
Association football goalkeepers
Living people
Terengganu FC players
Sri Pahang FC players
Sabah F.C. (Malaysia) players
People from Pahang
Footballers at the 2002 Asian Games
Southeast Asian Games bronze medalists for Malaysia
Southeast Asian Games medalists in football
Competitors at the 2001 Southeast Asian Games
Competitors at the 2003 Southeast Asian Games
Asian Games competitors for Malaysia